The 2004 European Judo Open Championships were the 1st edition of the European Judo Open Championships, and were held in Budapest, Hungary on 4 December 2004.

The European Judo Open Championships was staged because the open class event had been dropped from the European Judo Championships program from 2004. Unlike the regular European Judo Championships, several competitors from each country are allowed to enter.

Results

External links
 

E
Judo Championships
European Judo Open Championships
Judo Championships
Judo Championships
Judo
European 2004
Judo